Trier-Saarburg is a district in the west of Rhineland-Palatinate, Germany. Neighboring districts are (from the north and clockwise) Bitburg-Prüm, Bernkastel-Wittlich, Birkenfeld, Sankt Wendel (Saarland), and Merzig-Wadern (Saarland). To the west it borders Luxembourg. The district-free city Trier is surrounded by the district.

History
The district was created in 1969 by merging the previous districts Trier and Saarburg.

Geography
The main river in the district is the Moselle. The area between its tributaries, the Ruwer and the Saar, is also well known as one of the prime wine regions of Germany.

Museums

 Roscheider Hof Open Air Museum, Konz
 Fell Exhibition Slate Mine
 Air museum, Hermeskeil
 Railway and steam engine museum, Hermeskeil

Coat of arms
The coat of arms largely resembles the coat of arms of the Saarburg district. The castle in the middle shows the castle of Saarburg, even though now only the ruins of the castle remains. The red cross is the cross of Trier, as a large part of the Saarburg district (as well as of the new Trier-Saarburg district) historically belonged to the state of Trier. The blue bars were added after the merging with the Trier district, and symbolize that part of that district historically belonged to Luxembourg.

Verbandsgemeinden 
The district is divided into six Verbandsgemeinden. The list contains the coats of arms, the names, the district areas, exemplarily the population figures from 1950 as well as the current population figures:

Towns and municipalities 

Four towns and 100 municipalities make up the district in southwestern Germany.  The list contains the coats of arms, the names, the district areas, exemplarily the population figures from 1950 as well as the current population figures:

References

External links

 

 
Districts of Rhineland-Palatinate